The Book of Southern Tang, or sometimes called Ma's Book of Southern Tang (馬氏南唐書) to distinguish it from the later Lu's Book of Southern Tang, was a Chinese history book on the Five Dynasties and Ten Kingdoms period state of Southern Tang. Containing 30 chapters, it was written by Ma Ling in the early 12th century. Ma Ling's grandfather Ma Yuankang (馬元康) had been a resident of Southern Tang's capital Jinling (金陵; modern Nanjing, Jiangsu).

References

 
 

Chinese history texts
12th-century history books
Song dynasty literature
Southern Tang

History books about the Five Dynasties and Ten Kingdoms
12th-century Chinese books